Paul Hunder (12 January 1884 – 9 May 1948) was a German international footballer.

References

1884 births
1948 deaths
Association football midfielders
German footballers
Germany international footballers